John Gates Powell (June 25, 1947 – August 19, 2022) was an American track and field athlete who specialized in the discus throw. He set a world record at 69.08 meters in 1975, and his personal best of 71.26 meters ties him for ninth place in the all-time performers list.

Life and career 
Powell was born in San Francisco, California, on June 25, 1947. 

Powell graduated from San Jose State University and served with the San Jose Police Department for seven years. He left the police department to focus on his throwing career.

Powell was a four-time member of the American Olympic Team. Powell finished fourth at the 1972 Summer Olympics in Munich, won a bronze medal at the 1976 Summer Olympics in Montreal, and was a member of the 1980 U.S. Olympic team which did not compete in the USSR due to the 1980 Summer Olympics boycott. He did however receive one of 461 Congressional Gold Medals created especially for the athletes. He won the bronze medal at the 1984 Summer Olympics in Los Angeles.

Some track and field competitions in 1987 appear to have been Powell's last ones on the international level. Powell ran several annual weight-throwing camps with his fellow Olympian weight throwers. Powell also coached a few of his young champion-level throwers at the University of Nevada, Las Vegas, nearly every week. Powell also coached the throwers at Stanford University from 1981-1990.

In 2019, he was inducted into the National Track and Field Hall of Fame.

Powell died on August 19, 2022, at the age of 75.

Achievements 
 Fourth with 62.82 in the 1972 Summer Olympics in Munich
 First with 62.37 in the 1975 Pan American Games
 Third with 65.70 in the 1976 Summer Olympics in Montreal
 Third with 65.46 in the 1984 Summer Olympics in Los Angeles
 Second with 66.22 in the 1987 World Championships in Athletics in Rome
Powell is a seven time US-champion in Discus throw in 1974, 1975, 1983, 1984, 1985, 1986, 1987

References

External links 
 

1947 births
2022 deaths
American male discus throwers
Athletes (track and field) at the 1972 Summer Olympics
Athletes (track and field) at the 1975 Pan American Games
Athletes (track and field) at the 1976 Summer Olympics
Athletes (track and field) at the 1984 Summer Olympics
Olympic bronze medalists for the United States in track and field
World record setters in athletics (track and field)
World Athletics Championships medalists
Track and field athletes from San Francisco
Track and field athletes from San Jose, California
San Jose State Spartans men's track and field athletes
Medalists at the 1984 Summer Olympics
Medalists at the 1976 Summer Olympics
Pan American Games gold medalists for the United States
Pan American Games medalists in athletics (track and field)
Congressional Gold Medal recipients
Medalists at the 1975 Pan American Games